Bourne End railway station serves Bourne End in Buckinghamshire, England.

Services are provided by Great Western Railway. The ticket office is open on weekday and Saturday mornings. There is a customer car park south of the station. The station has two platforms.

History
The station was originally named Marlow Road station. In 1874 Marlow Road station was renamed Bourne End to obviate confusion with the newly opened Marlow station.

To reach Bourne End, a wooden viaduct was built across Cockmarsh and a wooden bridge was built across the River Thames.

In 1873 a line linking Bourne End with Marlow was opened to the public, with 1,700 tickets being sold in the first week. Originally the branch line was served by a third platform on the west side of the station.

The service on the branch line is known locally as the "Marlow Donkey", which is commemorated by a local pub of the same name, although the origin of the term is unclear. The 'small' waiting room building from Bourne End Station (left of picture) lives on at Bourne Again Junction on the Fawley Hill Railway, home of the late Sir William McAlpine. A camping coach was positioned here by the Western Region in 1960.

Partial closure
British Rail closed the line between Bourne End and High Wycombe in May 1970, but trains still run between Maidenhead and Marlow.

Future
It has been proposed that the Line between Bourne End and High Wycombe be reopened. A feasibility study is under way to see if it is economic to do so.

Services
Bourne End is a terminus but effectively acts as a through station, with the driver having to change ends to continue to the next station. During peak hours service frequency is increased by having two trains work the line, each using Bourne End as the terminus: one runs Marlow – Bourne End and one Maidenhead – Bourne End, with passengers changing trains at Bourne End. This service pattern is needed to meet peak-time demand, as the platforms at Bourne End are not long enough to accommodate longer trains. While Bourne End has two platforms, platform 2 is only accessible from Maidenhead and not from Marlow, and so cannot be used as a passing loop. Since May 2017 there are no through trains to London Paddington.

The basic daytime service runs hourly each way to Maidenhead & Marlow seven days a week, with the additional peak services operating half hourly Monday to Friday only.

References

External links

Railway stations in Buckinghamshire
DfT Category E stations
Former Great Western Railway stations
Railway stations in Great Britain opened in 1854
Railway stations served by Great Western Railway
1854 establishments in England